Costa Rica competed at the 2020 Summer Olympics in Tokyo. Originally scheduled to take place from 24 July to 9 August 2020, the Games were postponed to 23 July to 8 August 2021, because of the COVID-19 pandemic. It was the nation's sixteenth appearance at the Summer Olympics, since its debut in 1936.

Competitors
The following is the list of number of competitors participating in the Games:

Athletics

Costa Rican athletes further achieved the entry standards, either by qualifying time or by world ranking, in the following track and field events (up to a maximum of 3 athletes in each event):

Track & road events

Cycling

Road
Costa Rica entered one rider each to compete in the men's and women's Olympic road races, by virtue of his top 50 national finish (for men) and her top 100 individual finish (for women) in the UCI World Ranking.

BMX
Costa Rica entered one BMX rider to compete in the men's freestyle, by finishing in the top two at the 2019 UCI Urban Cycling World Championships in Chengdu, China.

Gymnastics

Artistic
Costa Rica entered one artistic gymnast into the Olympic competition, marking the country's debut in the sport. Luciana Alvarado scored a third-place finish to book the last of two available berths in the women's individual all-around and apparatus events at the 2021 Pan American Championships in Rio de Janeiro, Brazil.

Women

Judo
 
Costa Rica qualified one judoka for the men's half-lightweight category (66 kg) at the Games. Ian Sancho Chinchila accepted a continental berth from the Americas as the nation's top-ranked judoka outside of direct qualifying position in the IJF World Ranking List of June 28, 2021.

Surfing

Costa Rica sent two surfers to compete in the women's shortboard race and one surfer to compete in the men's shortboard race at the Games. Brisa Hennessy finished within the top eight of those eligible for qualification in the World Surf League rankings to secure her place on the Costa Rican roster for Tokyo 2020, with Leilani McGonagle joining her with a top-two finish in her heat at the 2021 ISA World Surfing Games in El Salvador. On July 23, Carlos Muñoz Herrera joined the nation's surfing squad at the Games after Portugal's Frederico Morais tested positive for COVID-19.

Swimming

Costa Rica received a universality invitation from FINA to send two top-ranked swimmers (one per gender) in their respective individual events to the Olympics, based on the FINA Points System of June 28, 2021.

Taekwondo

Originally, Costa Rica was not going to participate in taekwondo during these Olympic Games, however, the country received a last minute invitation after the Chilean delegation was unable to send a taekwondo player in the women's 57 kilogram category as a result of a positive test for COVID-19. Costa Rican Olympic Committee selected Nishy Lee Lindo to represent her country for the first time in taekwondo at the Games.

See also
Costa Rica at the 2019 Pan American Games

References

Nations at the 2020 Summer Olympics
2020
2021 in Costa Rican sport